The 2020–21 Nemzeti Bajnokság I (known as the K&H női kézilabda liga for sponsorship reasons) was the 70th season of the Nemzeti Bajnokság I, Hungarian premier Handball league.

Team information 
As in the previous season, 14 teams play in the 2020–21 season.
After the 2019–20 season no team got relegated or promoted due to the decision of the Hungarian Handball Federation that they made during the COVID-19 pandemic. No champion was named, the results of the season got deleted and the final league table of the 2018/19 season determined which clubs participated in the international competitions in 2020/21.

Personnel and kits
Following is the list of clubs competing in 2020–21 Nemzeti Bajnokság I, with their president, head coach, kit manufacturer and shirt sponsor.

Managerial changes

League table

Schedule and results
In the table below the home teams are listed on the left and the away teams along the top.

Season statistics

Top goalscorers

Top goalkeepers

Attendances

Matches between 11 November 2020 and 1 May 2021 were played behind closed doors.

1: The team played their home matches without spectators between 4 September and 21 May
2: The team played their home matches without spectators 
3: Matches without spectators are not included 
Updated on 8 May 2021. 
Attendance numbers without playoff matches.

Number of teams by counties

References

External links
 Hungarian Handball Federaration 
 handball.hu
 kezitortenelem.hu

Nemzeti Bajnokság I (women's handball)
2020–21 domestic handball leagues
Nemzeti Bajnoksag I Women
2020 in women's handball
2021 in women's handball